Yusuf-Zulekha is a 15th-century Bengali romantic story in verse written by Shah Muhammad Sagir, which is considered one of the greatest literary works of medieval "golden era" of Bengali literature; when Sagir was a court-poet of the Sultan of Bengal, Ghiyasuddin Azam Shah. Sagir wrote the story at the request of the Sultan.

References

External links

15th-century books
Bengali-language literature